Carlos Henriques da Silva Maia Pinto (5 June 1866, in Porto – 2 November 1932), more commonly known as Carlos Maia Pinto, was a Portuguese military officer and republican politician during the Portuguese First Republic who, among others posts, served as President of the Ministry (Prime Minister).

References

1866 births
1932 deaths
People from Porto
Prime Ministers of Portugal
Portuguese military personnel